Netflix is an American technology & media-services provider and production company headquartered in Los Gatos, California, founded in 1997 by Reed Hastings and Marc Randolph in Scotts Valley, California. This is an abridged history of the formation and growth of Netflix, which has grown to become the largest entertainment company in the United States in terms of market capitalization as of 2020.

Full timeline

References

Netflix
Netflix